Obukhovsky (masculine) or Obukhovskaya (feminine) is a Russian last name.

There are two theories regarding the origins of this last name. According to the first one, it is simply a variety of the last name Obukhov, which is derived from the nickname "" (Obukh). However, it is more likely that this last name was first given to one of the natives of a rural locality of Obukhovo.

References

Notes

Sources
И. М. Ганжина (I. M. Ganzhina). "Словарь современных русских фамилий" (Dictionary of Modern Russian Last Names). Москва, 2001. 

Russian-language surnames
